Seven and a Half may refer to:
 Seven and a half, a card game
 Seven and a Half (2006 film), a Serbian dark comedy film
 Seven and a Half (2019 film), an Iranian drama film